Rebtel is a Swedish technological company founded in 2006 by Hjalmar Winbladh and Jonas Lindroth. With its roots in international calling, it sells products and services to migrants and international nomads. Its services include international calling, messaging, and mobile money delivered in applications for Android, iPhone, and Windows Phone.

In 2015, a new management team took over, launching a new strategy with additional product verticals like banking, remittance, and independent work for migrants and international nomads.

As of August 2018, the company has 95 employees representing some 42 nationalities, making it one of Stockholm's most diverse technological companies. It offers products in more than 250 countries worldwide. In 2020, its revenue exceeded US$150 million.

Management
Rebtel's principal owners are European London-based venture capital funds Balderton Capital and Index Ventures. Its management team consists of the following people:

 Erik Olofsson - Chief Executive Officer
 Svante Pagels – Chief Commercial Officer
 Anna Skallefell – Chief Financial Officer
 Jude Mukundane – Chief Technology Officer

Products and services

Rebtel
Rebtel provides low-cost or free international call services The company started with a "Rebel theme" in opposition to the prevailing high international calling rates at the time of its launch. Its service was first available as an intermediary service accessible by dialing a particular phone number, but is now available through iOS and Android apps with a combined download count totaling over 10M users.

Mobile top-up money transfer 
Rebtels tech platform supports money transfer in the form of mobile top-up, in which users can transfer credit to others by mobile phone in a manner common in unbanked parts of the world. In early 2018, the company launched Nauta for the Cuban community.

Activist program (Rebtel Activista) 
Rebtel’s Activist program was launched in 2016 as a pilot in Miami, Florida, enabling anyone to sign up to become a Rebtel reseller through the independent Activist app. Since the launch, the Activist program has expanded to Houston, Texas. Over 10,000 people have joined the program.

Beyond borders magazine 
Late 2017, Rebtel launched and published its first edition of Beyond Borders, an online magazine and community that curates and creates content and journalism by and for the global group of international nomads and migrants.

SDK
Rebtel launched an software development kit (SDK) in September 2012, allowing independent developers to integrate voice calling and instant messaging in their apps. The Rebtel SDK currently supports app-to-app communication over data—such as 3G or Wi-Fi—and uses the same backend as Rebtel’s own apps. Developers can decide how to handle aspects of the user experience, such as user management, ringtones, and calling screens.

Sendly
In December 2013, Rebtel launched Sendly, a new app that lets users top up the prepaid mobile phones of friends and family abroad.

History
Hjalmar Winbladh co-founded and spent seven years as president and CEO of Sendit AB, taking the firm public before it was acquired by Microsoft for US$127.5 million in 1999. Rebtel appointed Andreas Bernström, formerly COO of TradeDoubler, as CEO in September 2009. In late 2015, Bernström left the company and was succeeded by Magnus Larsson. In 2014, a group of former executives from Tele2—a telecommunications company owned by Swedish investment company Kinnevik—approached the company’s owners with a proposal for a shift in strategy.

Following a brand overhaul, a product strategy shift moving to a subscription model and flat-rate pricing, and the launch of an independent work program (Activist), the company experienced a turnaround: it grew 40% after one year, and reached a revenue of $95 million in 2017. CEO Magnus Larsson said to Thompson Reuters in 2017 that he had no plans to make the company public. 

In 2020, Rebtel posted revenue in excess of $150 million and seemed on track to exceed $200 million in 2021, mostly boosted by communication needs during COVID-19 lockdowns. In 2021, Rebtel split with Majority, a fintech with the aim of solving banking needs for immigrants. Rebtel then took on new management and has since positioned itself as a marketplace for cross-border communication and remittance needs of the global immigrant population.

Timeline
May 2005: Rebtel is registered by Hjalmar Winbladh and Jonas Lindroth.
September 2006: Rebtel raises Series A round of US$20 million in external venture capital financing from Index Ventures and Balderton Capital.
October 2009: Rebtel launches its iPhone application after a nine-month approval process with Apple.
June 2010: Rebtel reports a 100% jump in revenue over the previous year, increasing revenue from $8 million to $16 million. The service also logs its one billionth minute in international calls.
January 2011: Rebtel reports 9 million users, revenues of more than $40 million in 2011, and a revenue run-rate projected to hit $75 million by the end of year.
November 2011: Rebtel is awarded the Swedish Innovation Award. Previous winners include music streaming service Spotify.
September 2012: Rebtel releases its SDK, allowing developers to integrate voice calling into their applications.
December 2012: Rebtel reports revenues of $80 million and 20 million users.
December 2013: Rebtel launches Sendly, a new service for transferring prepaid mobile credit internationally. Rebtel reports revenues of $95 million and 23 million users.
January 2016: Rebtel appoints Magnus Larsson as CEO and communicates goal to become the primary app for international calling (similar to WhatsApp is for texting).
April 2017: Rebtel says to Thompson Reuters that it seeks a $20 million "cash injection for growth".
August 2017: Rebtel Activist independent work program fuels rapid US market growth; CEO claims 20% growth target for 2017.
December 2017: Rebtel launches online magazine aimed at migrants and international nomads worldwide.
April 2018: Rebtel announces it has closed its financing process, securing close to $20 million, now aiming to invest 130 million Swedish kronor in developing banking products and/or to acquire a neo bank to speed up the execution of the company's new strategy.

See also
 Comparison of VoIP software

References

VoIP companies of Sweden
Android (operating system) software
IOS software
Windows Phone software
Companies based in Stockholm